Aenigmina is a genus of moths in the family Sesiidae.

Species
Aenigmina aenea  Le Cerf, 1912
Aenigmina critheis (Druce, 1899)
Aenigmina latimargo  Le Cerf, 1912
Aenigmina tiresa (Druce, 1899)

References

Sesiidae